A Justice Itinerant was a royal appointed official sent to the English counties and Ireland to administer justice.

References
 

Medieval English law
Historical legal occupations